The Education Act 2005 (c 18) is an Act of the Parliament of the United Kingdom. It was enacted in order to simplify the process of school improvement, strengthening the accountability framework for schools, in particular by amending the approach used by Ofsted when inspecting schools in England. This Act repealed the provisions of the School Inspections Act 1996.

The Act also brought about changes to the role of the Teacher Training Agency, broadened the need for local education authorities to invite proposals for new schools, and introduced 3-year budgets for maintained schools.

The Education Act is divided into five parts, which are summarised below:

Part 1 - School inspections and other inspections by school inspectors

This part of the Act sets out
Procedures for appointment and removal of Her Majesty's Chief Inspectors of Schools in England and Wales
Requirements for inspections of schools at 'prescribed intervals'
Requirement to publish school inspection reports
The circumstances under which a school should be deemed to require special measures or significant improvement; and
Procedures to be invoked when a school is deemed to require special measures or significant improvement; and
The steps which must be taken by responsible authorities in such circumstances
The parties to whom a copy of the final school inspection report must be passed
The provision for the inspection of Religious Education in faith schools
The provision of rights to inspect by other authorities, including local education authorities
The circumstances under which the National Assembly for Wales may amend the inspection framework for use in Wales

Part 2 - School organisation
This part of the Act:
amends the processes by which an organisation can propose the creation of a community, foundation or voluntary school
amends procedures for proposing the discontinuation of rural primary schools

Part 3 - Training the school workforce
This part of the Act:
renames the Teacher Training Agency as the Training and Development Agency for Schools (TDA).
extends the responsibilities of the TDA to include continuing professional development for teachers and schools and raising standards of teaching, in addition to its existing role of promoting teaching as a career
sets out the circumstances under which the TDA will work in Wales under the authority of the National Assembly for Wales
sets out the financial framework within which the TDA will work
sets out the funding arrangements for the Higher Education Funding Council for Wales (HEFCW)
sets out the power of maintained schools to provide training for the school workforce

Part 4 - Miscellaneous
This part of the Act contains miscellaneous provisions which:
require local education authorities to set targets for pupils in their care and in their schools
remove the requirement for school governors to produce an annual report, or to hold an annual meeting with parents.
introduce the requirement for governors to produce a School profile
make specific admission arrangements for children in the care of the local authority.
set out the requirement for the sharing of information in relation to Education Maintenance Allowance payments, and the provision of free school meals.
make arrangements for the provision of alternative education for otherwise excluded pupils.

Part 5 - General
This part of the Act indicates those functions which may be exercised by the National Assembly for Wales in respect of Wales.

Section 125 - Commencement
The following orders have been made under section 125(4):
The Education Act 2005 (Commencement No.1 and Savings and Transitional Provisions) Order 2005 (S.I. 2005/2034 (C. 87))
The Education Act 2005 (Commencement No. 2 and Transitional Provisions and Savings) Order 2006 (S.I. 2006/2129 (C. 70))
The Education Act 2005 (Commencement No. 1 and Transitional Provisions) (Wales) Order 2006 (S.I. 2006/1338 (W. 130) (C. 45))
The Education Act 2005 (Commencement No. 2) (Wales) Order 2010 (S.I. 2010/735 (W. 72) (C. 49))

See also
Education Act

References
Halsbury's Statutes,

External links

United Kingdom Acts of Parliament 2005
United Kingdom Education Acts
2005 in education
April 2005 events in the United Kingdom